The 1986–87 Superliga Juvenil de Fútbol season was the first since its establishment.

League table

See also
1987 Copa del Rey Juvenil

External links
 Royal Spanish Football Federation website
Arquero-Arba Futbolme

División de Honor Juvenil de Fútbol seasons
Juvenil